Czarnica  is a village in Gmina Miastko, Bytów County, Pomeranian Voivodeship, in northern Poland, on the border with West Pomeranian Voivodeship.

From 1975 to 1998 the village was in Słupsk Voivodeship. 

It has a population of 153.

References
Notes

Bibliography

Map of the Gmina Miastko

Czarnica